The Campbieil is a summit in the French Pyrenees, culminating at a height of . It is located in the Néouvielle massif, included in the Pyrenees National Park of which it constitutes the second highest summit, after the pic Long.

History 
The first recorded ascension dates from 1848, by captain Loupot who was carrying out triangulation works. Of very easy access by its western slope, that of Gèdre, the summit is frequented by sheep and isards and has ever been ambled by shepherds and hunters.

Access 
The most frequented access route runs today through the north, by a path which presents no difficulty (besides its steepness), from the Cap de Long dam.

Another slightly shorter route, is accessible to the east : which consists in reaching the Estaragne by ascending the stream hollow of Estaragne from the D 929, then to walk along the crest. It too, presents no major difficulty, at least not on a clear summer day.

See also 
 List of Pyrenean three-thousanders

Mountains of the Pyrenees
Mountains of Hautes-Pyrénées
Landforms of Hautes-Pyrénées
Pyrenean three-thousanders